Anisophyllea corneri is a tree of tropical Asia in the family Anisophylleaceae. It is named for the English botanist Edred John Henry Corner.

Description
Its bark is smooth.

Distribution and habitat
Anisophyllea corneri grows naturally in Peninsular Malaysia and Borneo. Its habitat is lowland mixed dipterocarp to submontane forests from sea-level to  altitude.

References

corneri
Trees of Peninsular Malaysia
Trees of Borneo
Plants described in 1958
Taxonomy articles created by Polbot